Andronidas, was with Callicrates the leader of the Roman party among the Achaeans. In 146 BCE, he was sent by Metellus to Diaeus, the commander of the Achaeans, to offer peace; but the peace was rejected, and Andronidas was seized by Diaeus, who however released him upon the payment of a talent.

Notes

2nd-century BC Romans
2nd-century BC Greek people
Achaean League